Henri Lehnen (19 March 1899 – 4 November 1963) was a Luxembourgian weightlifter. He competed in the men's light-heavyweight event at the 1924 Summer Olympics.

References

External links
 

1899 births
1963 deaths
Luxembourgian male weightlifters
Olympic weightlifters of Luxembourg
Weightlifters at the 1924 Summer Olympics
People from Luxembourg (canton)